Fredrik Jan Elis Norrena (born November 29, 1973) is a Finnish former professional ice hockey goaltender. He played 100 games in the National Hockey League with the Columbus Blue Jackets between 2006 and 2008. The rest of his career, which lasted from 1992 to 2014, was mainly spent in Europe, where he mainly played in the Finnish SM-liiga and Swedish Elitserien. Internationally Norrena played for the Finnish national team at five World Championships, winning one silver and one bronze medal, and the 2006 Winter Olympics, winning a silver medal.

Playing career 

Norrena started his pro hockey career with TPS in the SM-liiga, winning four Finnish championships. In 2003, he won the Swedish Championships with Frölunda before joining Linköping in the Swedish Elitserien (SEL). He has represented Finland numerous times in international play, including as number-two goaltender in the 2006 Winter Olympics and as number-one goaltender in the 2006 World Championships.

On May 31, 2006, the Tampa Bay Lightning announced they have signed Norrena to a one-year entry-level contract. However, on June 30, he was traded to the Columbus Blue Jackets, along with Fredrik Modin, for Marc Denis. Norrena made his NHL debut on October 14 against the Minnesota Wild, stepping in to replace Pascal Leclaire in the second period. Norrena eventually took over as number-one goaltender for Blue Jackets for the 2006–07 season, playing 55 out of 82 games in his first NHL-season. Norrena also set a team record by not allowing a goal in 155 minutes and 28 seconds of play. The Blue Jackets rewarded Norrena in February 2007 with a two-year contract.

He served as the backup to Columbus' number one goaltender, Pascal Leclaire, for two seasons until 2008–09, when Steve Mason was called up from the Syracuse Crunch of the American Hockey League (AHL). On December 15, 2008, Norrena was placed on waivers. He was not picked up by another team and was sent to Columbus' AHL affiliate in Syracuse. On December 20, Norrena signed with Ak Bars Kazan of the Kontinental Hockey League (KHL) for the rest of the season. On December 30, Norrena was added to Ak Bars' roster. He won the championship of 2008–09 with Kazan. After his tenure in Russia, he signed a two-year contract with his former team of Linköping in Sweden, a club where he had three very successful years between 2003 and 2006.

In May 2012, Norrena signed a one-year contract with Växjö Lakers of the SEL.

In April 2013, Norrena announced his retirement. Norrena later become a goaltending coach for TPS of the Finnish top-tier league SM-liiga since.

In June 2013, TPS announced that Norrena would be their goaltender for the upcoming season and Urpo Ylönen would be their goaltending coach.

On May 12, 2014, Norrena again retired as a player.

International

 Played for Finland at the 2002 World Championships
 Played for Finland at the 2005 World Championships
 Played for Finland at the 2005 World Championships
 Played for Finland at the 2006 Winter Olympic Games (Silver Medal)
 Played for Finland at the 2006 World Championships (Bronze Medal)
 Played for Finland at the 2007 World Championships (Silver Medal)

Career statistics

Regular season and playoffs

International

Records
 Elitserien league record for shutouts in a regular season (9), 2003–04, 50-game schedule
 Linköping club record for shutouts in a regular season (9), 2003–04, 50-game schedule

References

External links

1973 births
Living people
People from Jakobstad
AIK IF players
Ak Bars Kazan players
Columbus Blue Jackets players
Finnish expatriate ice hockey players in Russia
Finnish ice hockey goaltenders
Frölunda HC players
HC TPS players
Ice hockey players at the 2006 Winter Olympics
Linköping HC players
Lukko players
Medalists at the 2006 Winter Olympics
Olympic ice hockey players of Finland
Olympic medalists in ice hockey
Olympic silver medalists for Finland
Swedish-speaking Finns
Tampa Bay Lightning draft picks
Växjö Lakers players
Sportspeople from Ostrobothnia (region)